Vasile Huţanu (1 June 1954 – 24 February 2014) was a Romanian ice hockey player. He played for the Romania men's national ice hockey team at the 1976 Winter Olympics in Innsbruck.

References

1954 births
2014 deaths
Ice hockey players at the 1976 Winter Olympics
Olympic ice hockey players of Romania
Romanian ice hockey centres
Steaua Rangers players